This a list of the number-one singles on the PROMUSICAE Top 20 Physical Singles chart in 2005.

See also 
2005 in music
List of number-one hits in Spain

References

2005 in Spanish music
Spain singles
2005